Katary Falls is  approximately 10 km from Coonoor in the Nilgiris district in the state of Tamil Nadu, India. At 55 metres (180 ft) in height, Katary Falls is third largest waterfall in the Nilgiris; one can reach it by trecking.

The falls are the site of India's first hydel power plant, the Kateri hydroelectric system.

See also
 Coonoor
 Nilgiri mountains
 Catherine Falls
 Lamb's Rock
 Sim's Park
 Law's Falls
 Dolphin's Nose
 Kateri hydro-electric system
 Lady Canning's Seat

References

Tourist attractions in Nilgiris district
Waterfalls of Tamil Nadu
Coonoor